Silky Soul is an album by the Bay Area-based R&B group Maze, released in 1989 on Warner Bros. Records.

Critical reception
The Rolling Stone Album Guide wrote that Silky Soul "finds Maze updating its graceful sound with a subtly bracing touch of synthesized rhythms." The Boston Globe thought that Frankie Beverly ably spans "boudoir intimacies and pleas for South African liberation and black cooperation—all with a voice as cool and buttery as [Marvin] Gaye's."

Track listing
All songs written by  Frankie Beverly

"Silky Soul"	6:44 	
"Can't Get Over You"	5:23 	
"Just Us" 	7:39 	
"Somebody Else's Arms"	5:53
"Midnight" 6:32	
"Love's on the Run"	5:34 	
"Change Our Ways" 	5:15 	
"Songs of Love" 	6:14
"Mandela" 	6:36
"Africa" 2:11

Charts

Singles

See also
List of number-one R&B albums of 1989 (U.S.)

References

External links
 Maze Featuring Frankie Beverly -Silky Soul at Discogs

1989 albums
Maze (band) albums
Warner Records albums